Elvis Manuel Monteiro Macedo (born 27 July 1985), known as Babanco, is a Cape Verdean professional footballer who plays for Portuguese club U.D. Leiria as a midfielder.

He spent most of his career in Portugal, making exactly 150 appearances in the Primeira Liga for Olhanense, Estoril and Feirense.

Babanco earned a record 62 caps for Cape Verde from 2007 to 2019, representing the country at the Africa Cup of Nations in 2013 and 2015.

Club career
Born in Praia, Babanco started playing football with local Sporting Clube da Praia. In 2009, he moved to another club in his hometown, Boavista FC.

In the 2010–11 season, Babanco signed with F.C. Arouca in Portugal, which was competing for the first time ever in the Segunda Liga. He was first choice during his two-year spell, with the Aveiro District side consecutively managing to retain their league status.

On 5 June 2012, Babanco signed a two-year deal with Primeira Liga club S.C. Olhanense. A year later, he made his way to G.D. Estoril Praia on a free transfer, valid until 2016.

After starting the season with AEL Limassol in the Cypriot First Division, Babanco rescinded his contract and returned to Portugal's top flight on 24 January 2017 on an 18-month deal at C.D. Feirense. He scored his first goal in the division on 3 March 2018 to open a 3–0 home win against Boavista FC.

Babanco joined G.D. Chaves of the second tier on 2 September 2019, with the 34-year-old agreeing to a one-year contract. He made only two competitive appearances during his spell at the Estádio Municipal Eng. Manuel Branco Teixeira, and subsequently moved to the lower leagues with U.D. Leiria.

International career
Babanco made his senior international debut for Cape Verde on 9 September 2007, in a 4–0 away victory over Guinea in 2008 Africa Cup of Nations qualification. On 7 December he scored his first goal to equalise in a 1–1 draw with hosts Guinea-Bissau in the 2007 edition of the Amílcar Cabral Cup. On 24 May 2010, he appeared in a friendly in Covilhã with Portugal – who were preparing for the 2010 FIFA World Cup in South Africa – playing 60 minutes as the minnows (ranked 117th) managed a 0–0 draw.

Babanco was chosen for the 2013 Africa Cup of Nations – his country's first major tournament – where they were eliminated in the quarter-finals by Ghana. He was also called up two years later for the tournament in Equatorial Guinea.

International goals
 (Cape Verde score listed first, score column indicates score after each Babanco goal)

References

External links

1985 births
Living people
Sportspeople from Praia
Cape Verdean footballers
Footballers from Santiago, Cape Verde
Association football midfielders
Santiago South Premier Division players
Cape Verdean National Championships players
Sporting Clube da Praia players
Boavista FC (Cape Verde) players
Primeira Liga players
Liga Portugal 2 players
Campeonato de Portugal (league) players
F.C. Arouca players
S.C. Olhanense players
G.D. Estoril Praia players
C.D. Feirense players
G.D. Chaves players
U.D. Leiria players
Cypriot First Division players
AEL Limassol players
Cape Verde international footballers
2013 Africa Cup of Nations players
2015 Africa Cup of Nations players
Cape Verdean expatriate footballers
Expatriate footballers in Portugal
Expatriate footballers in Cyprus
Cape Verdean expatriate sportspeople in Portugal
Cape Verdean expatriate sportspeople in Cyprus